"Cincinnati, Ohio" is a song written and released by Bill Anderson and later covered by Connie Smith in 1967.

The song, composed and originally recorded by Anderson in 1964, told of a tired woman attempting to move from Louisville, Kentucky, to her hometown of Cincinnati, Ohio. The song rose to #4 on the country charts, becoming one of her many top ten hits she had in the 1960s, and also becoming one of her signature songs.

A cover version exists, done by the Osborne Brothers from the 1990 release "Hillbilly Fever". 

During the 7th innings at Cincinnati Reds home games Smith’s version is played, with the words across the stadium screens.

Chart performance

References

External links
 

1967 songs
1967 singles
Connie Smith songs
Songs written by Bill Anderson (singer)
Song recordings produced by Chet Atkins
RCA Records singles
Music of Cincinnati
Songs about cities in the United States
Songs about Cincinnati